Back with the Ex is an Australian reality television series which premiered on the Seven Network on 18 April 2018. The show features former couples who want to give their relationship a second chance.

The series is distributed on Netflix outside of Australia and released in January 2019 although removed in January 2023.

Couples

Ratings

References

External links
 
Back with the Ex on 7plus

2010s Australian reality television series
2018 Australian television series debuts
2018 Australian television series endings
Seven Network original programming
Australian dating and relationship reality television series
English-language television shows
Television series by Seven Productions